Crosfield is a surname. Notable people with the surname include:

Sir Arthur Crosfield, 1st Baronet (1865–1938), British politician
Domini Crosfield (died 1963), British politician
John Crosfield (1915–2012), English businessman and inventor
Joseph Crosfield (1792–1844), English businessman
Margaret Crosfield (1859–1952), English palaeontologist and geologist
Philip Crosfield (1924–2013), British Anglican priest
William Crosfield (1838–1909), British politician

See also
Crosfield Electronics, British electronics company
Crossfield (disambiguation)
Crisfield (surname)

English-language surnames